IRSG may refer to:
 Irish Republican Solidarity Group, a think tank for some of the groups in Britain campaigning for a United Ireland.
 Information Retrieval Specialist Group, a specialist group of the British Computer Society promoting Information Retrieval
 International Rubber Study Group, an intergovernmental organization providing a forum for the discussion of matters affecting the supply and demand of both synthetic and natural rubber.
 Internet Research Steering Group
 International Regulatory Strategy Group A City of London group whose purpose is "to contribute to the shaping of the international regulatory regime, at global, regional and national levels"